Danish may refer to:
 Something of, from, or related to the country of Denmark

People 
 A national or citizen of Denmark, also called a "Dane," see Demographics of Denmark
 Culture of Denmark
 Danish people or Danes, people with a Danish ancestral or ethnic identity
 A member of the Danes, a Germanic tribe
 Danish (name), a male given name and surname

Language 
 Danish language, a North Germanic language used mostly in Denmark and Northern Germany
 Danish tongue or Old Norse, the parent language of all North Germanic languages

Food 
 Danish cuisine
 Danish pastry, often simply called a "Danish"

See also 
 Dane (disambiguation)
 
 Gdańsk
 List of Danes
 Languages of Denmark

Language and nationality disambiguation pages